Hugo Licher (10 March 1902 – 14 April 1943) was a Dutch gymnast. He competed in seven events at the 1928 Summer Olympics.

References

1902 births
1943 deaths
Dutch male artistic gymnasts
Olympic gymnasts of the Netherlands
Gymnasts at the 1928 Summer Olympics
Sportspeople from Duisburg